The Haunted Mine is a 1946 American Western film directed by Derwin Abrahams and written by Frank H. Young. This is the twentieth and final film in the "Marshal Nevada Jack McKenzie" series, and stars Johnny Mack Brown as Jack McKenzie and Raymond Hatton as his sidekick Sandy Hopkins, with Linda Leighton, Riley Hill, John Merton and Ray Bennett. The film was released on March 2, 1946, by Monogram Pictures.

Cast          
Johnny Mack Brown as Nevada Jack McKenzie
Raymond Hatton as Sandy Hopkins
Linda Leighton as Jenny Durant 
Riley Hill as Dan McLeod
John Merton as Steve Twining
Ray Bennett as The Old Hermit 
Claire Whitney as Mrs. Durant
Marshall Reed as Blackie 
Robert Bentley as Tracy
Terry Frost as Bill Meade 
Lynton Brent as Skyball
Leonard St. Leo as Stirrup
Frank LaRue as Matterson

References

External links

American black-and-white films
American Western (genre) films
1946 Western (genre) films
Monogram Pictures films
Films directed by Derwin Abrahams
1940s American films
1940s English-language films